The 2011 AFC Champions League was the 30th edition of the top-level Asian club football tournament organized by the Asian Football Confederation (AFC), and the 9th under the current AFC Champions League title. The winners, Al-Sadd qualified for the 2011 FIFA Club World Cup in Japan.

Allocation of entries per association

The AFC approved criteria for participation in the 2011 and 2012 seasons. The final decision date was set after the Executive Committee meeting in November 2010.

On 30 November 2009, the AFC announced 12 more MA's that were keen to join the ACL, in addition to ten participating national associations. Singapore later withdrew. The full list of candidate associations were as follows:

East Asia
 Already participating:  Australia,  China PR,  Indonesia,  Japan,  Korea Republic
 Keen to participate:  Malaysia,  Myanmar,   Thailand
 Withdrew:  Singapore
 Disqualified:  Vietnam

West Asia
 Already participating:  Iran,  Qatar,  Saudi Arabia,  UAE,  Uzbekistan
 Keen to participate:  Iraq,  Jordan,  Oman,  Pakistan,  Palestine,  Tajikistan,  Yemen,  India

Note: Singapore, Thailand, Vietnam and India have clubs taking part in play-offs to qualify for the group stages of ACL in 2010.

Entrants per association

The allocation for entry to the 2011 ACL stayed the same as the previous two seasons with the exception of Vietnam who were disqualified and their previous playoff slot was awarded to Qatar.

* One of the K-League clubs, Sangju Sangmu Phoenix, is unable to qualify for the ACL because the team is not a commercial entity and their players are not professionally contracted.

** One of the A-League clubs, Wellington Phoenix, is based in New Zealand, an OFC member country. They are unable to qualify for the ACL.

The finalists of the 2010 AFC Cup also participated in the play-off, provided that they meet the Champions League criteria.

Teams
The following is the list of direct entrants for the group stage confirmed by the AFC.

* Number of appearances (including qualifying rounds) since the 2002/03 season, when the competition was rebranded as the AFC Champions League

The following is the list of participants for the playoff stage confirmed by the AFC. The committee further proposed that one team be shifted by the means of a draw from the West to the East for sake of balance.

Schedule
Schedule of dates for 2011 competition.

Qualifying play-off

The draw for the qualifying play-off was held in Kuala Lumpur, Malaysia on 7 December 2010. In order to create balance another draw was held, moving one of the teams (Al-Ain) from the West into the East side of the play-offs.

The two winners from the qualifying play-off (one from West Asia and one from East Asia) advanced to the group stage. All losers from the qualifying play-off entered the 2011 AFC Cup group stage.

West Asia

!colspan="3"|Semi-final

|-
!colspan="3"|Final

|}

East Asia

!colspan="3"|Semi-final

|-
!colspan="3"|Final

|}

Group stage

The draw for the group stage was held in Kuala Lumpur, Malaysia on 7 December 2010. Clubs from the same country may not be drawn into the same group. The winners and runners-up of each group advanced to the knockout stage.

Group A

Group B

Group C

Group D

Group E

Group F

Group G

Group H

Knockout stage

Bracket

Round of 16
Based on the results from the group stage, the matchups of the round of 16 were decided as below. Each tie was played as one match, hosted by the winners of each group (Team 1) against the runners-up of another group (Team 2).

Quarter-finals
The draw for the quarter-finals, semi-finals, and final was held in Kuala Lumpur, Malaysia on 7 June 2011. In this draw, the "country protection" rule was applied: if there are exactly two clubs from the same country, they may not face each other in the quarter-finals; however, if there are more than two clubs from the same country, they may face each other in the quarter-finals.

Semi-finals

Final

The final of the 2011 AFC Champions League was hosted by one of the finalists, decided by draw. This format was a change from the 2009 and 2010 editions, where the final was played at a neutral venue.

Awards
The following awards were given for the 2011 AFC Champions League:
Most Valuable Player Award:  Lee Dong-Gook (Jeonbuk Hyundai Motors)
Top Scorer:  Lee Dong-Gook (Jeonbuk Hyundai Motors)
Fair Play Award:  Jeonbuk Hyundai Motors

Top scorers
Note: Goals scored in qualifying round not counted.

See also
2011 AFC Cup
2011 AFC President's Cup

References

External links
AFC Champions League Official Website

 
2011
1